Choanozoa is a clade of opisthokont eukaryotes consisting of the choanoflagellates (Choanoflagellatea) and the animals (Animalia, Metazoa). The sister-group relationship between the choanoflagellates and animals has important implications for the origin of the animals. The clade was identified in 2015 by Graham Budd and Sören Jensen, who used the name Apoikozoa. The 2018 revision of the classification first proposed by the International Society of Protistologists in 2012 recommends the use of the name Choanozoa.

Introduction
A close relationship between choanoflagellates and animals has long been recognised, dating back at least to the 1840s. A particularly striking and famous similarity between the single-celled choanoflagellates and multicellular animals is provided by the collar cells of sponges and the overall morphology of the choanoflagellate cell. The relationship has since been confirmed by multiple molecular analyses. This proposed homology was however thrown into some doubt in 2013 by the still controversial suggestion that ctenophores, and not sponges, are the sister group to all other animals. More recent genomic work has suggested that choanoflagellates possess some of the important genetic machinery necessary for the multicellularity found in animals.

A synonym for the Choanozoa, Apoikozoa, derives from the ancient Greek for "colony" and "animal", referring to the ability of both animals and (some) choanoflagellates to form multicellular units. While animals are permanently multicellular, the colony-building choanoflagellates are only sometimes so, which raises the question of whether or not the colony-building ability in both groups was present at the base of the entire clade, or whether it was independently derived within the animals and choanoflagellates. In either case, these two groups are the only heterotrophs known to form colonies.

Nomenclature
The name "Choanozoa" was used by Thomas Cavalier-Smith in 1991 to refer to a group of basal protists that later proved not to form a clade. Adl et al. (2018) regard the name as appropriate for the clade of choanoflagellates and animals, since the Greek choanē (χοάνη), meaning 'funnel', refers to the collar, which is a synapomorphy of the clade. They reject the name "Apoikozoa" as being neither formally defined nor appropriate, since it refers to the ability to form colonies, which is not unique to this clade.

Evolutionary implications
Although the last common ancestor of the Choanozoa cannot be reconstructed with certainty, Budd and Jensen suggest that these organisms formed benthic colonies that competed for space amongst other mat-forming organisms known to have existed during the Ediacaran Period some 635–540 million years ago.  As such they would form an important link between the unicellular ancestors of the animals and the enigmatic "Ediacaran" organisms known from this interval, thus allowing some sort of reconstruction of the earliest animals and their ecology. In the following cladogram, an indication is given of approximately how many million years ago (Mya) the clades diverged into newer clades. (Note that the later Budd and Jensen paper gives significantly younger dates. See also Kimberella.) The holomycota tree follows Tedersoo et al.

References

Opisthokont unranked clades